Austin Haynes (born 3 July 2008) is a British child actor. He is known for playing Thomas in The Railway Children Return (2022).

Career 
Haynes began acting at age 8 after landing a role in BBC's The A Word. Austin's first breakthrough role was busking on the streets in the iconic Co-op advert for Christmas in 2020 to Oasis' Round Are Way with younger brother, Rocco.  In addition to The Railway Children Return, in which he plays Thomas, a country child, Austin has also starred in a series of other productions including All Creatures Great And Small, as Andrew Simmonds a work experience boy. Austin's latest project is playing the grandson of Joe Rantz in The Boys In The Boat, directed by George Clooney, a sweeping story about a 1930's American rowing team.

Filmography 
Film

Television

References 

2008 births
Living people